The Australian women's national under-17 soccer team represents Australia in international women's under-17 soccer. The team is controlled by the governing body for soccer in Australia, Football Federation Australia (FFA), which is currently a member of the Asian Football Confederation (AFC) and the regional ASEAN Football Federation (AFF) since leaving the Oceania Football Confederation (OFC) in 2006. The team's official nickname is the Junior Matildas.

History
The first Australian women's national under-17 team was assembled in 2007 following Australia's entry into the Asian Football Confederation.

Coaching staff

Players

Current squad
The following 30 players were named to the squad for the training camp from 5–10 February, held in Canberra. 

Caps and goals correct as of 4 October 2022 after the match against South Korea.

Recent call-ups
The following players have been called up to the squad within the last 12 months and still remain eligible for selection.

Notes:
 TOP Train-on player.

Recent results and fixtures

2022

2023

Competitive record

FIFA U-17 Women's World Cup

AFC U-16 Women's Championship/AFC U-17 Women's Asian Cup

AFF U-16 Women's Championship

AFF U-18 Women's Championship

References

External links
 FFA Junior Matildas website

Asian women's national under-17 association football teams
National youth sports teams of Australia